Romance in the Dark is a 2009 compilation album of recordings by singer and pianist Jeri Southern.

Track listing

 “Imagination” (Jimmy Van Heusen, Johnny Burke)
 “Could Ya?” (William Carey, Carl Fischer)
 “Give Me Time” (Alec Wilder)
 “A Mighty Pretty Waltz” (Al Hoffman, Norman Gimbel)
 “You Better Go Now” (Irvin Graham, Bickley Reichner)
 “Baby, Did You Hear?” (Robert Ecton, Katie Lee)
 “That Ole Devil Called Love” (Allan Roberts, Doris Fisher)
 “Miss Johnson Phoned Again Today” (Lupin Fien, Al Siegel, Irving Mills)
 “The Very Thought of You” (Ray Noble)
 “The Cabin” (Paul Bowles, Tennessee Williams)
 “(I’m In Love With) The Honourable Mr. So-And-So” (Sam Coslow)
 “Where Walks My True Love?” (Sylvia Fine, Sammy Cahn)
 “You Forgot Your Gloves” (Ned Lehak, Edward Eliscu)
 “My Ideal” (Richard A. Whiting, Newell Chase, Leo Robin)
 “I've Got Five Dollars” (Richard Rodgers, Lorenz Hart)
 “All Too Soon” (Duke Ellington, Carl Sigman)
 “If I Had You” (James Campbell, Reginald Connelly, Ted Shapiro)
 “What’s My Name?” (Robert Wells, David Saxon)
 “My Old Flame” (Arthur Johnston, Sam Coslow)
 “Am I Blue?” (Harry Akst, Grant Clarke)
 “No Moon at All” (Redd Evans, David Mann)
 “Romance in the Dark” (Lil Green)
 “It Must Be True” (Harry Barris, Gus Arnheim, Gordon Clifford)
 “Everything But You” (Duke Ellington, Harry James, Don George)

Personnel
 Tracks 1 and 2 - unknown instrumental accompaniment (New York 1949)
 Track 3 - Jeri Southern (vocal, piano) with Sy Oliver’s Orchestra, Hymie Schertzer, Dick Jacobs, Bill Holcomb, Harold Feldman, Murray Williams (reeds), Sal Gide (piano, celeste), George Barnes (guitar), George Duvivier (double bass), Rudy Tralor (drums), unknown strings  (New York 4 January 1952
 Track 4 - Jeri Southern (vocal, piano) with Victor Young’s Orchestra, personnel unknown (New York 3 April 1952)
 Tracks 5 and 6 - Jeri Southern (vocal) with Camarata and His Music (New York 9 October 1951)
 Track 7 - Jeri Southern (vocal) with Camarata and His Music (New York 22 September 1953)
 Tracks 8,  9, 10 and 11 - Jeri Southern (vocal, piano) with The Dave Barbour Trio, Dave Barbour (guitar) (Los Angeles February/March 1954)
 Track 12 - Jeri Southern (vocal) with Camarata and His Music (New York 1955)
 Tracks 13-24 - Jeri Southern (vocal) with Ralph Burns’ Orchestra (personnel unknown) (New York 1957)

2009 compilation albums
Jeri Southern albums